Bosco Sodi is a Mexican contemporary artist. He was born in Mexico City in 1970, and works in Barcelona, Berlin, Mexico and New York City.

Work 

In 2014 Sodi opened Casa Wabi, an arts centre outside Puerto Escondido, in the Mexican state of Oaxaca. Parts of it were designed by the Pritzker-Prize-winning Japanese architect Tadao Ando. He also operates an exhibition place called Santa María in Mexico City and an art residency called Casa Nano in Tokyo.

His installation Muro – a wall of bricks made in Mexico – was built in Washington Square Park in New York on 8 September 2017, and dismantled the same day by passers-by who took a brick each. The work was created again on the South Bank in London on the occasion of the visit to the United Kingdom of Donald Trump.

Life 

Sodi is the son of Juan Sodi, a property developer and chemical engineer. He lives in the Red Hook area of Brooklyn, New York, with his wife the designer Lucía Corredor, and his three teenagers.

References

Further reading 

 Dakin Hart, Juan Manuel Bonet (2020). Bosco Sodi. New York: Rizzoli International. .

1970 births
Living people
Mexican contemporary artists
People from Mexico City
Mexican people of Italian descent
Bosco